Chamberlain Hill is a mountain located in the Catskill Mountains of New York west of North Franklin. Jackson Hill is located east-southeast and Franklin Mountain is located northeast of Chamberlain Hill.

References

Mountains of Delaware County, New York
Mountains of New York (state)